Li Lei (born February 18, 1987, in Harbin) is a Chinese male alpine ski racer.

He competed for China at the 2010 Winter Olympics in the Slalom and Giant Slalom events.

References 

1987 births
Living people
Chinese male alpine skiers
Olympic alpine skiers of China
Alpine skiers at the 2010 Winter Olympics
Alpine skiers at the 2007 Asian Winter Games
Skiers from Harbin
21st-century Chinese people